Duke of Tetuán is a hereditary title in the Peerage of Spain, accompanied by the dignity of Grandee and granted in 1860 by Isabella II to Leopoldo O'Donnell, 1st Count of Lucena and Prime Minister of Spain for several legislatures between 1856 and 1866.

It is a victory title, and was granted to O'Donnell as a result of his success at the Battle of Tétouan, during the War of Africa.

It has been held since its creation by members of the O'Donnell family, as the 5th Duchess, Blanca O'Donnell, died without issue of her marriage to Guillermo Pelizaeus. Should they have had children, the dukedom would have gone out of the family.

Dukes of Tetuan (1860-)
Leopoldo O'Donnell y Jorís, 1st Duke of Tetúan (1809–1867)
Carlos Manuel O'Donnell y Álvarez de Abreu, 2nd Duke of Tetuán (1834–1903), son of the 1st duke's eldest brother
Juan O'Donnell y Vargas, 3rd Duke of Tetuán (1864–1928), eldest son of the 2nd duke
Juan O'Donnell y Díaz de Mendoza, 4th Duke of Tetuán (1897–1934), eldest son of the 3rd duke
Blanca O'Donnell y Díaz de Mendoza, 5th Duchess of Tetuán (1898–1952), elder daughter of the 3rd duke
Leopoldo O'Donnell y Lara, 6th Duke of Tetuán (1915–2004), eldest son of the 2nd duke's third son
Hugo O'Donnell y Duque de Estrada, 7th Duke of Tetuán (b. 1948), eldest son of the 6th duke

The heir apparent is Carlos O'Donnell y Armada, 15th Marquess of Altamira (b. 1974).

See also
List of dukes in the peerage of Spain
List of current Grandees of Spain

Notes

References
Geneall.net List of Dukes of Tetuan

Dukes of Spain
Dukes of Tetuan
Grandees of Spain
O'Donnell dynasty
Duke
Noble titles created in 1860